Gold Horse Casino is a First Nations casino located in Lloydminster, Canada, situated on the Saskatchewan side of the provincial border.

Owned by the Saskatchewan Indian Gaming Authority (SIGA), the  facility broke ground on June 12, 2017, and opened to the public on December 21, 2018, after a formal opening ceremony on the 20th. Lloydminster MLA Colleen Young was in attendance for both events. It is Saskatchewan's seventh tribal casino, and includes a gaming floor with slot machines, 5 table games, and 18 electronic table games, as well as an events centre, meeting area, and a bar and grill.

The facility is situated on land owned by the Little Pine First Nation, who holds the municipal service agreement with the city of Lloydminster. A consortium known as the Border Tribal Council (formed by nearby First Nations) is the landlord and facility developer of the property, which is leased to the SIGA as operator.

See also
 List of casinos in Canada

References

External links 
 

Casinos in Saskatchewan
Buildings and structures in Lloydminster
Music venues in Saskatchewan
Tourist attractions in Saskatchewan
Casinos completed in 2018
2018 establishments in Saskatchewan